Měšice is a municipality and village in Prague-East District in the Central Bohemian Region of the Czech Republic. It has about 2,000 inhabitants.

History

The first written mention of Měšice is from 1294. In 1434, a stone fortress was built here. In 1767–1775 the Měšice Castle was built. In 1871–1872 the railroad to Všetaty was built, but the connection with Prague was not finished until 1888.

Sights
The Měšice Castle is the main landmark of Měšice. It is built in Rococo style with Neoclassical elements and contains remarkable sculptural and painterly decoration. It includes an English landscape garden with rare trees and the oldest lightning rod in Bohemia, which was installed in 1775. Today a private medical facility (Centre of Integrated Oncological Care) resides there.

References

External links

 (in Czech)

Villages in Prague-East District